is a Japanese company that manufactures plumbing fixtures, tiles, and other housing equipment. INAX is the toilet and plumbing subsidiary of the Lixil Group, which was formed in 2011, when it merged with Tostem and other companies.

It operates a number of ceramic museums in Tokoname that showcase the history of Tokoname ware ceramics industrial production in the region and of the company.

References

External links 

 http://inax.lixil.co.jp/ 

Phú Đông Phát
Bồn cầu Inax
Đại lý phân phối Inax tại TPHCM
Bathroom fixture companies
Manufacturing companies established in 1924
Companies based in Aichi Prefecture
Ceramics manufacturers of Japan
Japanese brands
Multinational companies headquartered in Japan
Lixil Group
1924 establishments in Japan